The Avon River flows northeast from its sources in rough country southwest of Blenheim to reach the Waihopai River  from the latter's outflow into the Wairau River of New Zealand.

See also
 Avon River (Canterbury), a river of the same name in Christchurch

References

Rivers of the Marlborough Region
Rivers of New Zealand